Betty Mitchell Awards were created in 1998 to celebrate and honour outstanding achievement in Calgary's professional theatre community. It is commonly called the Betty Award and is named for Calgary theatre pioneer Dr. Betty Mitchell.

Awards
The awards ceremony for the 2018–19 season was held on June 24 at the Vertigo Theatre in Calgary.

In 2019, Pakistani-Canadian actor Ahad Raza Mir, the first Pakistani actor to play Hamlet in Canada, won the Betty for Outstanding Performance by an Actor in a Drama for his performance of the title role  In that same year Tiffany Ayalik became the first Inuit recipient of a Betty Award.

Categories
Awards are given in the following categories:

Outstanding Performance by an Ensemble
Outstanding Performance by an Actress in a Supporting Role
Outstanding Lighting Design
Outstanding Set Design
Outstanding Performance by an Actor in a Supporting Role

Outstanding Costume Design
Outstanding Sound Design or Composition
Outstanding Choreography or Fight Direction
Outstanding Musical Direction
Outstanding Performance by an Actress in a Comedy or Musical
Outstanding Performance by an Actor in a Comedy or Musical
Outstanding New Play
Outstanding Direction
Outstanding Performance by an Actress in a Drama
Outstanding Performance by an Actor in a Drama
Outstanding Production of a Musical
Outstanding Production of a Play

Ceremony

Statue update
The original Betty Mitchell Award statue, designed by local Calgary sculptor, Petronella Overes, was inspired by the geography surrounding Calgary.  It was a steel base containing a glass monolith with motifs of mountains and prairies.  For the 10th anniversary of the awards in 2007 she redesigned it replacing the steel base with powder coated aluminum and increased the contrast in the tone and texture of the awards metal and glass.

The Award received its most recent design update in 2014 when the Overes design was replaced with a multi-colour teardrop-shaped glass sculpture created by a local glass blowing collective, Bee Kingdom Glass. Each one is unique, as they are hand-blown.

See also

 Black Theatre Workshop
 Dora Mavor Moore Award
 Elizabeth Sterling Haynes Award
 Floyd S. Chalmers Canadian Play Award
 Gascon-Thomas Award
 Jessie Richardson Theatre Award
 Rideau Awards
 Robert Merritt Awards

References

External links
Betty Mitchell Awards Official Website

Awards established in 1998
Canadian theatre awards
Theatre in Calgary
Awards for projection designers